Several scholars have accused the United States of involvement in state terrorism. They have written about the US and other liberal democracies' use of state terrorism, particularly in relation to the Cold War. According to them, state terrorism is used to protect the interest of capitalist elites, and the U.S. organized a neo-colonial system of client states, co-operating with regional elites to rule through terror. This work has proved controversial with mainstream scholars of terrorism, who concentrate on non-state terrorism and the state terrorism of dictatorships.

Such works include Noam Chomsky and Edward S. Herman's The Political Economy of Human Rights (1979), Herman's The Real Terror Network (1985), Alexander L. George's Western State Terrorism (1991), Frederick Gareau's State Terrorism and the United States (2004), and Doug Stokes' America's Other War (2005).  Of these, Ruth J. Blakeley considers Chomsky and Herman as being the foremost writers on the United States and state terrorism.

Notable works
Beginning in the late 1970s, Noam Chomsky and Edward S. Herman wrote a series of books on the United States' involvement with state terrorism. Their writings coincided with reports by Amnesty International and other human rights organizations of a new global "epidemic" of state torture and murder. Chomsky and Herman argued that terror was concentrated in the U.S. sphere of influence in developing countries, and documented human rights abuses carried out by U.S. client states in Latin America.  They argued that of ten Latin American countries that had death squads, all were US client states. Worldwide they claimed that 74% of regimes that used torture on an administrative basis were U.S. client states, receiving military and other support from the U.S. to retain power. They concluded that the global rise in state terror was a result of U.S. foreign policy.

Chomsky concluded that all powers backed state terrorism in client states.  At the top were the U.S. and other powers, notably the United Kingdom and France, that provided financial, military, and diplomatic support to Third World regimes kept in power through violence. These governments acted together with multinational corporations, particularly in the arms and security industries. In addition, other developing countries outside the Western sphere of influence carried out state terror supported by rival powers.

The alleged involvement of major powers in state terrorism in developing countries has led scholars to study it as a global phenomenon rather than study individual countries in isolation.

In 1991, a book edited by Alexander L. George also argued that other Western powers sponsored terror in developing countries.  It concluded that the U.S. and its allies were the main supporters of terrorism throughout the world. Gareau states that the number of deaths caused by non-state terrorism (3,668 deaths between 1968 and 1980, as estimated by the Central Intelligence Agency (CIA)) is "dwarfed" by those resulting from state terrorism in US-backed regimes such as Guatemala (150,000 killed, 50,000 missing during the Guatemalan Civil War - 93% of whom Gareau classifies as "victims of state terrorism").

Among other scholars, Ruth J. Blakeley says that the United States and its allies sponsored and deployed state terrorism on an "enormous scale" during the Cold War. The justification given for this was to contain Communism, but Blakeley contends it was also a means by which to buttress the interests of U.S. business elites and to promote the expansion of neoliberalism throughout the Global South. Mark Aarons posits that right-wing authoritarian regimes and dictatorships backed by Western powers committed atrocities and mass killings that rival the Communist world, citing examples such as the Indonesian occupation of East Timor, the Indonesian mass killings of 1965–66, the "disappearances" in Guatemala during the civil war, and the assassinations and state terrorism associated with Operation Condor throughout South America. In Worse Than War, Daniel Goldhagen argues that during the last two decades of the Cold War, the number of American client states practicing mass murder outnumbered those of the Soviet Union. According to Latin Americanist John Henry Coatsworth, the number of repression victims in Latin America alone far surpassed that of the U.S.S.R. and its East European satellites during the period 1960 to 1990. J. Patrice McSherry asserts that "hundreds of thousands of Latin Americans were tortured, abducted or killed by right-wing military regimes as part of the US-led anti-communist crusade."

Definition

The United States legal definition of terrorism excludes acts done by recognized states. According to U.S. law (22 U.S.C. 2656f(d)(2)) terrorism is defined as "premeditated, politically motivated violence perpetrated against noncombatant targets by subnational groups or clandestine agents, usually intended to influence an audience". There is no international consensus on a legal or academic definition of terrorism. United Nations conventions have failed to reach consensus on definitions of non-state or state terrorism.

According to professor Mark Selden, "American politicians and most social scientists definitionally exclude actions and policies of the United States and its allies" as terrorism. Historian Henry Commager wrote that "Even when definitions of terrorism allow for state terrorism, state actions in this area tend to be seen through the prism of war or national self-defense, not terror." According to Dr Myra Williamson, the meaning of "terrorism" has undergone a transformation. During the reign of terror a regime or system of terrorism was used as an instrument of governance, wielded by a recently established revolutionary state against the enemies of the people. Now the term "terrorism" is commonly used to describe terrorist acts committed by non-state or subnational entities against a state.

In State terrorism and the United States Frederick F. Gareau writes that the intent of terrorism is to intimidate or coerce both targeted groups and larger sectors of society that share or could be led to share the values of targeted groups by causing them "intense fear, anxiety, apprehension, panic, dread and/or horror".  The objective of terrorism against the state is to force governments to change their policies, to overthrow governments or even to destroy the state.  The objective of state terrorism is to eliminate people who are considered to be actual or potential enemies, and to discourage those actual or potential enemies who are not eliminated.

General critiques

Professor William Odom, formerly President Reagan's National Security Agency Director, wrote:

As many critics have pointed out, terrorism is not an enemy. It is a tactic. Because the United States itself has a long record of supporting terrorists and using terrorist tactics, the slogans of today's war on terrorism merely makes the United States look hypocritical to the rest of the world.

Professor Richard Falk holds that the US and other rich states, as well as mainstream mass media institutions, have obfuscated the true character and scope of terrorism, promulgating a one-sided view from the standpoint of First World privilege. He has said that:

If 'terrorism' as a term of moral and legal opprobrium is to be used at all, then it should apply to violence deliberately targeting civilians, whether committed by state actors or their non-state enemies.

Falk has argued that the repudiation of authentic non-state terrorism is insufficient as a strategy for mitigating it.
Falk also argued that people who committed "terrorist" acts against the United States could use the Nuremberg Defense.

Daniel Schorr, reviewing Falk's Revolutionaries and Functionaries, stated that Falk's definition of terrorism hinges on some unstated definition of "permissible"; this, says Schorr, makes the judgment of what is terrorism inherently "subjective", and furthermore, he claims, leads Falk to label some acts he considers impermissible as "terrorism", but others he considers permissible as merely "terroristic".

In a review of Chomsky and Herman's The Political Economy of Human Rights, Yale political science professor James S. Fishkin holds that the authors' case for accusing the United States of state terrorism is "shockingly overstated". Fishkin writes of Chomsky and Herman:

They infer an extent of American control and coordination comparable to the Soviet role in Eastern Europe.  ... Yet even if all [the authors'] evidence were accepted ... it would add up to no more than systematic support, not control. Hence the comparison to Eastern Europe appears grossly overstated. And from the fact that we give assistance to countries that practice terror it is too much to conclude that "Washington has become the torture and political murder capital of the world." Chomsky's and Herman's indictment of US foreign policy is thus the mirror image of the Pax Americana rhetoric they criticize: it rests on the illusion of American omnipotence throughout the world. And because they refuse to attribute any substantial independence to countries that are, in some sense, within America's sphere of influence, the entire burden for all the political crimes of the non-communist world can be brought home to Washington.

Fishkin praises Chomsky and Herman for documenting human rights violations, but argues that this is evidence "for a far lesser moral charge", namely, that the United States could have used its influence to prevent certain governments from committing acts of torture or murder but chose not to do so.

Commenting on Chomsky's 9-11, former US Secretary of Education William Bennett said: "Chomsky says in the book that the United States is a leading terrorist state. That's a preposterous and ridiculous claim.  ... What we have done is liberated Kuwait, helped in Bosnia and the Balkans. We have provided sanctuary for people of all faiths, including Islam, in the United States. We tried to help in Somalia.  ... Do we have faults and imperfections? Of course. The notion that we're a leading terrorist state is preposterous."

Stephen Morris also criticized Chomsky's thesis:

There is only one regime which has received arms and aid from the United States, and which has a record of brutality that is even a noticeable fraction of the brutality of Pol Pot, Idi Amin, Mao, or the Hanoi Politburo. That is the Suharto government in Indonesia.  But ... the United States was not the principal foreign supplier of Indonesia when the generals seized power (nor is there any credible evidence of American involvement in the coup).  Within the period of American assistance to Indonesia, and in particular during the period of the Carter administration, the number of political prisoners has declined.  Finally, the current brutality of the Suharto regime is being directed against the people of East Timor, a former colony of Portugal that Indonesia is attempting to take over by force ... not as part of its normal process of domestic rule.

In 2017, declassified documents from the U.S. Embassy in Jakarta have confirmed that the United States government, from the very beginning, was deeply involved in the campaign of mass killings which followed Suharto's seizure of power. Without the support of the U.S. and its Western allies, the massacres would not have happened. In 2016, an international tribunal in The Hague ruled that the killings constitute crimes against humanity and it also ruled that the United States and other Western governments were complicit in the crimes. Indian historian Vijay Prashad says that the complicity of the United States and its Western allies in the massacres "is beyond doubt," as they "provided the Indonesian armed forces with lists of Communists who were to be assassinated" and "egged on the Army to conduct these massacres." He adds they covered up this "absolute atrocity" and that the US in particular refuses to fully declassify its records for this period. According to Vincent Bevins, the Indonesian mass killings were not an aberration, but the apex of a loose network of US-backed anti-communist mass killing campaigns in the Global South during the Cold War. According to historian Brad Simpson:

Washington did everything in its power to encourage and facilitate the army-led massacre of alleged PKI members, and U.S. officials worried only that the killing of the party's unarmed supporters might not go far enough, permitting Sukarno to return to power and frustrate the [Johnson] Administration's emerging plans for a post-Sukarno Indonesia. This was efficacious terror, an essential building block of the neoliberal policies that the West would attempt to impose on Indonesia after Sukarno's ouster.

See also
Debate over the atomic bombings of Hiroshima and Nagasaki
Iran and state-sponsored terrorism
Perceptions of the United States sanctions
Targeted killings by the United States government
United States and state-sponsored terrorism
War crimes committed by the United States

Notes

References

 Blakeley, Ruth (2009).  State Terrorism and Neoliberalism: The North in the South. Routledge. 
 Donahue, Laura K. "Terrorism and counter-terrorist discourse". In Hor, Michael Yew Meng, Ramraj, Victor Vridar and Roach, Kent (Eds.), Global anti-terrorism law and policy. United Kingdom: Cambridge University Press, 2005  

 
 Taylor, Antony James William. Justice as a basic human need. Nova Science Publishers, 2006.

Further reading
 
 
 Campbell, Bruce B., and Brenner, Arthur D., eds. 2000. Death Squads in Global Perspective: Murder with Deniability. New York: St. Martin's Press
 
 
 
 Menjívar, Cecilia and Rodríguez, Néstor, editors, When States Kill: Latin America, the U.S., and Technologies of Terror, University of Texas Press 2005,
 
 

Foreign relations of the United States
Terrorism committed by the United States